Zarrin Rural District is in Zayandehrud District of Saman County, Chaharmahal and Bakhtiari province, Iran. At the most recent National Census of 2016, the population of the rural district was 3,769 in 1,226 households. The largest of its four villages was Markdeh, with 1,601 people.

References 

Saman County

Rural Districts of Chaharmahal and Bakhtiari Province

Populated places in Chaharmahal and Bakhtiari Province

Populated places in Saman County

fa:دهستان زرین (سامان)